The 2008–09 IFA Premiership (known as the JJB Sports Premiership for sponsorship reasons) was the first season after a major overhaul of the league system in Northern Ireland, and the 108th season of Irish league football overall. It was scheduled to begin on 9 August 2008. However, the start of the league was delayed by a week due to a referees' strike. The season eventually began on 16 August 2008, and concluded on 2 May 2009. Linfield were the defending champions, but narrowly fell short of retaining the title as rivals Glentoran pipped them by a single point to win their 23rd league title overall.

Team changes from 2007–08
The league was reduced from sixteen to twelve teams as a result of the league system in Northern Ireland being restructured by the IFA.

Five of last season's sixteen Premier League teams failed to gain a place in the new twelve-team Premiership, and one new team - Bangor - gained entry from the IFA Intermediate League.

Of the five teams who missed out, three - Armagh City, Larne and Limavady United failed to obtain the necessary domestic licence. Portadown obtained a licence, but was controversially excluded because a club official missed a deadline for submitting an application form by several minutes. Finally, Donegal Celtic obtained a licence, but was ranked thirteenth in the entry list, and thus missed out by one place.

Team overview

League table

Results

Matches 1–22
During matches 1–22 each team played every other team twice (home and away).

Matches 23–33
During matches 23–33 each team played every other team for the third time (either at home, or away).

Matches 34–38
During matches 34–38 each team played every other team in their half of the table once (either at home or away).

Section A

Section B

Promotion/relegation play-off
The relegation/promotion system was slightly modified because Bangor, who withdrew from the next IFA Premiership season, eventually finished 11th. It meant that last placed Dungannon Swifts played a two-legged match against Donegal Celtic, runners-up of the 2008–09 IFA Championship, for one spot in the 2009–10 IFA Premiership. The score was 2–2 on aggregate, but Dungannon Swifts secured their spot in the following IFA Premiership season by winning on away goals.

2–2 on aggregate. Dungannon Swifts won on away goals rule and remained in the IFA Premiership.

References

NIFL Premiership seasons
North
1